Egorka is a 1984 Soviet adventure film directed by Aleksandr Yanovsky.

Plot 
The sailors found a teddy bear and decided to call him Yegorka. He gives them trust and love, and in the end, the sailors let him go.

Cast 
 Mikhail Pugovkin as boatswain Toporshchuk
 Gennady Frolov as Nalyvayko
  Gennady Voronin  as ship commander
 Aleksei Veselkin as sailor Shutkin
  Andrei Kostyakin  as Sorokin
 Igor Zolotovitsky as Rybakov
 Aleksandr Baluev as border boat commander
 Igor Bochkin
 Sergey Bobrov

References

External links 
 

1984 films
1980s Russian-language films
Soviet adventure films
Gorky Film Studio films
1980s adventure films
Films based on Russian novels